Almirante Ice Fringe is a narrow ice piedmont bordering the southwest side of Andvord Bay on Danco Coast, Graham Land, Antarctica. Named by the Polish Antarctic Expedition, about 1995, after the Almirante Brown Antarctic Base on nearby Coughtrey Peninsula, Paradise Harbor.

See also
List of Antarctic expeditions

References
 

Ice piedmonts of Graham Land
Poland and the Antarctic
Danco Coast